Estaimpuis ( or ;) is a municipality of Wallonia located in the province of Hainaut, Belgium. 

The municipality is located in Picardy Wallonia.

Geography

Villages (former municipalities) in the municipality:
 Estaimpuis (I)
 Évregnies (II)
 Saint-Léger (III)
 Estaimbourg (IV)
 Leers-Nord (V)
 Néchin (VI)
 Bailleul (VII)

Neighbouring villages (and the municipalities to which they belong) in Belgium:
 Herseaux (Mouscron) (a)
 Dottignies (Mouscron) (b)
 Espierres (Spiere-Helkijn) (c)
 Warcoing (Pecq) (d)
 Pecq (Pecq) (e)
 Esquelmes (Pecq) (f)
 Ramegnies-Chin (Tournai) (g)
 Templeuve (Tournai) (h)

Neighbouring municipalities in France:
 Wattrelos (k)
 Leers (j)
 Toufflers (i)

Gallery

References

External links
 

Municipalities of Hainaut (province)